Coconuco, also known as Guambiano and Misak, is a dialect cluster of Colombia spoken by the Guambiano indigenous people. Though the three varieties, Guambiano, moribund Totoró, and the extinct Coconuco are traditionally called languages, Adelaar & Muysken (2004) believe that they are best treated as a single language.

Totoró may be extinct; it had 4 speakers in 1998 out of an ethnic population of 4,000. Guambiano, on the other hand, is vibrant and growing.

Coconucan was for a time mistakenly included in a spurious Paezan language family, due to a purported "Moguex" (Guambiano) vocabulary that turned out to be a mix of Páez and Guambiano (Curnow 1998).

Phonology 
The Guambiano inventory is as follows (Curnow & Liddicoat 1998:386).

References

Further reading
 Adelaar, Willem F. H.; & Muysken, Pieter C. 2004. The languages of the Andes. Cambridge language surveys. Cambridge University Press.
 Branks, Judith; Sánchez, Juan Bautista. 1978. The drama of life: A study of life cycle customs among the Guambiano, Colombia, South America (pp xii, 107). Summer Institute of Linguistics Museum of Anthropology Publication (No. 4). Dallas: Summer Institute of Linguistics Museum of Anthropology.
 Curnow, Timothy Jowan, & Liddicoat, Anthony J. 1998. The Barbacoan Languages of Colombia and Ecuador, Anthropological Linguistics, 40:3:384–408.
 Fabre, Alain. 2005. Diccionario etnolingüístico y guía bibliográfica de los pueblos indígenas sudamericanos: Guambiano

Barbacoan languages
Languages of Colombia
Cauca Department